Anthony Thomas Augelli (March 27, 1902 – October 22, 1985) was a United States district judge of the United States District Court for the District of New Jersey.

Education and career

Born in Orsara di Puglia, Italy, Augelli received a Bachelor of Laws from New Jersey Law School (now Rutgers Law School) in 1929. He received a Master of Laws from Mercer Beasley School of Law (now Rutgers Law School) in 1934. He was in private practice of law in Jersey City, New Jersey from 1930 to 1961.

Federal judicial service

Augelli was nominated by President John F. Kennedy on September 14, 1961, to the United States District Court for the District of New Jersey, to a new seat created by 75 Stat. 80. He was confirmed by the United States Senate on September 21, 1961, and received his commission on September 22, 1961. He served as Chief Judge from 1968 to 1972. He assumed senior status on April 1, 1972. His service was terminated on August 31, 1974, due to resignation. His resignation was prompted by Congress's refusal to raise judicial salaries.

Post judicial service and death

Following his resignation from the federal bench, Augelli was an umpire of the dealer relations plan for General Motors in Newark, New Jersey from 1974 to 1985. A resident of Spring Lake Heights, New Jersey since moving from Jersey City in 1973, Augelli died at the age of 83 at his home on October 22, 1985.

References

Sources
 

1902 births
1985 deaths
Italian emigrants to the United States
Rutgers University alumni
Judges of the United States District Court for the District of New Jersey
United States district court judges appointed by John F. Kennedy
20th-century American judges
20th-century American lawyers
American people of Italian descent
People from Jersey City, New Jersey
People from Spring Lake Heights, New Jersey